Mikael Larsson (born 19 May 1971) is a Swedish archer. He competed in the men's individual and team events at the 1996 Summer Olympics.

References

External links
 

1971 births
Living people
Swedish male archers
Olympic archers of Sweden
Archers at the 1996 Summer Olympics
People from Sandviken Municipality
Sportspeople from Gävleborg County
20th-century Swedish people